John Scott Wisniewski (born June 28, 1962) is an American Democratic Party politician, who served in the New Jersey General Assembly from 1996 to 2018, where he represented the 19th Legislative District. He was a Democratic candidate for Governor of New Jersey in the 2017 election, he lost in the primary election to Phil Murphy.

Early life, education, and law career
Wisniewski was born on June 28, 1962, in Perth Amboy, New Jersey. He is of Polish descent, and the son of a factory worker. He attended Sacred Heart Elementary School in South Amboy and Sayreville War Memorial High School in nearby Sayreville, New Jersey.

In 1984, he received a B.A. from Rutgers University in English / Economics and was awarded a J.D. from the Seton Hall University School of Law in 1987, where he was a classmate of New Jersey Governor Chris Christie.

Wisniewski is an adjunct professor at Monmouth University.

He also owns and runs a general practice law firm, Wisniewski and Associates, L.L.C., based out of Sayreville.

Political career
Before joining the General Assembly, Wisniewski served on the Sayreville Cable Television Advisory Board, the Middlesex County Senior Citizen Housing Task Force, and the Middlesex County Planning Board. He has also served on the Sayreville Board of Education's Building Utilization Committee. Wisniewski currently serves on the board of trustees for the United Way of Central New Jersey and is an Executive Board Member of the Middlesex County Arts and Education Council.

Legislative career
Democrats statewide saw a net gain of three seats in the Assembly in the 1995 elections, with two of the pickups coming in the 19th District where Arline Friscia and Wisniewski knocked off the Republican incumbents Stephen A. Mikulak and Ernest L. Oros.

In the Assembly, Wisniewski introduced legislation that includes the Work First New Jersey Act, which required individuals to work at jobs or in community services as a condition of their benefits, the Dormitory Safety Act which required the installation of sprinklers in all dormitories, the School Bus Enhanced Safety Inspection Act which created new ways and standards by which a school bus was inspected, and the Athletic Training Licensure Act which required athletic trainers to be licensed. Assemblyman Wisniewski also sponsored the bill that was signed into law which increased the property tax reduction for Veterans and seniors, legislation designed to strengthen Megan's Law by keeping sexual predators away from areas where children go to school and play, legislation which required newly constructed elevators in residential buildings to accommodate stretchers, legislation which required the implementation of a fire command structure in mutual aid fires, legislation which required that cell phone use be noted in traffic accidents, legislation that established a penalty for the theft of someone's personal identification information, and legislation which established a scholarship program for the families of the victims of the September 11, 2001 terrorist attacks.

On January 27, 2010, Wisniewski was selected to succeed Joseph Cryan as the Chairman of the New Jersey Democratic State Committee. He was succeeded by John Currie in 2013.

In 2011, Wisniewski was the Democratic Co-chair of the 2011 New Jersey Apportionment Commission, the group charged with redrawing the lines for the legislative districts following the 2010 Census. Along with State Senator Loretta Weinberg, Wisniewski played a major role in uncovering the Fort Lee lane closure scandal. He was a co-chair of the New Jersey Legislative Select Committee on Investigation tasked with investigating the scandal.

In 2013, Wisniewski joined the overwhelming majority of his fellow Democratic Party members in Middlesex County in endorsing Frank Pallone, in a special election for U.S. Senate after the death of longtime New Jersey Senator Frank Lautenberg.  He later endorsed the Democratic Party's ultimate nominee, Cory Booker.

In August 2015, Wisniewski voted in favor of funding Planned Parenthood in New Jersey, joining prominent New Jersey Democrats, including Sheila Oliver and Patrick Diegnan. Wisniewski previously voted five times to outlaw or restrict access to abortion in New Jersey.

He has also expressed that he would vote in favor of a gas tax hike only if Governor Christie was going to sign it into law.

Wisniewski was reelected in 2015 by a wide margin. He received the endorsement of numerous local newspapers, including the Home News Tribune, who also endorsed his running mate Craig Coughlin and fellow Central Jersey Nancy Pinkin and Diegnan.

Transportation Committee
In the Assembly he has served as the Deputy Speaker since 2004, was the Assistant Majority Leader from 2002–2003 and was the Deputy Minority Conference Leader 1998-2001. Wisniewski serves in the Assembly on the Transportation, Public Works and Independent Authorities Committee (as Chair) and the Environment and Solid Waste Committee. Since 2000, he has chaired the state Fire Safety Commission.

In his role as Chairman of the Assembly Transportation Committee, Assemblyman Wisniewski led a fact finding probe into the state's E-ZPass system. Assemblyman Wisniewski is a prime sponsor of the Motor Vehicle Security and Customer Service Act which was signed into law on January 28, 2003. He was a prime sponsor of A-3392 which would consolidate two of the state's toll road agencies.

"Bridgegate" Fort Lee lane closure scandal investigation 
He led the investigation into the Fort Lee lane closure scandal. He expressed grave skepticism about Christie's claim that he did not know his aides had ordered lanes closed on the George Washington Bridge, and believes that the closures were illegal.  He has also said that if Christie is involved, it would be an impeachable offense.

New Jersey Chairman for Bernie Sanders 
U.S. Senator Bernie Sanders announced on January 4, 2016 that Wisniewski would lead his New Jersey operation in his campaign for the democratic nomination in the 2016 United States presidential election. Wisniewski cited Sanders' efforts to reduce income inequality and take money out of politics as the main reasons for his endorsement. Being the only elected politician in New Jersey to endorse Sanders, Wisniewski was at the forefront of the Senator's campaign in New Jersey, attending mock debates and hosting fundraisers. Clinton won the New Jersey Democratic primary by a two-to-one margin.

2017 gubernatorial campaign 
Wisniewski announced his candidacy for the Democratic nomination for New Jersey governor in the 2017 election in November 2016. The contest between Wisniewski and Phil Murphy attracted attention because the two had supported Sanders and Clinton, respectively, in the preceding year's Democratic presidential primaries.

On June 6, 2017, Wisniewski lost the primary election, coming in third place with 21.6% of the vote. Murphy won the nomination with 48.4% of the vote; Wisniewski also finished behind Jim Johnson. Murphy also won every county in New Jersey except for Salem County, which Wisniewski won. Wisniewski subsequently supported Murphy in the campaign against Republican nominee Kim Guadagno.

District 19
Each of the forty districts in the New Jersey Legislature has one representative in the New Jersey Senate and two members in the New Jersey General Assembly. The other representatives from the 19th District for the 2012-2013 Legislative Session are:
Senator Joseph Vitale
Assemblyman Craig Coughlin

Personal life 
He is married to Deborah (née McLaughlin) and has three daughters.

They currently reside in Sayreville.

References

External links

Assemblyman Wisniewski's legislative webpage, New Jersey Legislature
New Jersey Legislature financial disclosure forms
2016 2015 2014 2013 2012 2011 2010 2009 2008 2007 2006 2005 2004
Assembly Member John S. Wisniewski, Project Vote Smart
New Jersey Voter Information Website 2003 (defunct)
Assemblyman Wisniewski's Website (now for campaign)
Official Governor campaign website
Wisniewski's video announcing his run for Governor

|-

1962 births
Living people
21st-century American politicians
American politicians of Polish descent
Candidates in the 2017 United States elections
Chairmen of the New Jersey Democratic State Committee
Democratic Party members of the New Jersey General Assembly
New Jersey lawyers
People from Sayreville, New Jersey
Politicians from Perth Amboy, New Jersey
Rutgers University alumni
Sayreville War Memorial High School alumni
Seton Hall University School of Law alumni